Norimasa Iwai (born 12 March 1973) is a Japanese gymnast. He competed at the 2000 Summer Olympics, where he placed seventh in the still rings final.

References

External links
 

1973 births
Living people
Japanese male artistic gymnasts
Olympic gymnasts of Japan
Gymnasts at the 2000 Summer Olympics
Sportspeople from Nagano Prefecture
People from Matsumoto, Nagano